At least two ships of the French Navy have been named Tempête:

 , a  launched in 1876 and expended as a target in 1909.
 , a  launched in 1925 and scrapped in 1950.

French Navy ship names